Portrait of Madame Marcotte de Sainte-Marie is an 1826 painting by Jean-Auguste-Dominique Ingres of Suzanne Clarisse de Salvaing de Boissieu, wife of Marie Marcotte de Sainte-Marie. It is one of his earliest surviving portraits and one of the few portraits of women he produced in Paris straight after his return from Rome. Studies for it are now in the Louvre and a gallery in Montauban.

The painting initially belonged to its subject until her death. In 1862 it was left to her son Henri Marcotte de Sainte-Marie and in 1916 to his children. In 1923 it was acquired via David David-Weill by the Louvre, where it now hangs.

External links
 Louvre catalog entry
 Joconde database entry

1826 paintings
Paintings in the Louvre by French artists
Sainte-Marie
Madame de Sainte-Marie
Madame de Sainte-Marie